Rita Drávucz (born 14 April 1980 in Szolnok) is a water polo player from Hungary, who competed for her native country at the 2004 Summer Olympics in Athens, Greece, the 2008 Summer Olympics in Beijing, China and the 2012 Summer Olympics in the London, Great Britain.

Drávucz was a member of the Hungary women's national team that claimed the title at the 2001 Women's European Water Polo Championship in Budapest, Hungary, and 2002 FINA Women's Water Polo World Cup

Since 2011 she plays for Italian top division side Pro Recco.

See also
 Hungary women's Olympic water polo team records and statistics
 List of players who have appeared in multiple women's Olympic water polo tournaments
 List of women's Olympic water polo tournament top goalscorers
 List of world champions in women's water polo
 List of World Aquatics Championships medalists in water polo

References

External links
 

1980 births
Living people
People from Szolnok
Hungarian female water polo players
Olympic water polo players of Hungary
Water polo players at the 2004 Summer Olympics
Water polo players at the 2008 Summer Olympics
Water polo players at the 2012 Summer Olympics
Hungarian expatriate sportspeople in Italy
World Aquatics Championships medalists in water polo
Sportspeople from Jász-Nagykun-Szolnok County
20th-century Hungarian women
21st-century Hungarian women
Expatriate water polo players